The H323Plus project, formerly OpenH323, has as goal developing a full featured, open source (MPL) implementation of the H.323 Voice over IP protocol. The code is written in C++ and, through the development effort of numerous people around the world, fully supports the H.323 protocol. The software has been integrated into a number of open source and commercial software products.

Software published under the OpenH323 project includes

The implementation of VoIP protocols 
 PTLib - a multi-platform C++ class library. Programs based on PTLib can run on both Microsoft Windows and Unix/Linux. The library contains both the “basic” classes (strings, arrays, lists) and the higher-level functionality (networking, multi-threading).
 H323Plus – a library for the development of H.323 applications. It uses PTLib for platform independence. The library has its own ASN.1 parser that generates the classes for encoding and decoding of the protocol messages used in H.323.

Sample network phones implementations 
 OhPhone: Command-line phone
 OpenPhone: GUI for OpenH323

H.323 Related 
 OpenMCU: Conference server
 OpenAM: Answering machine
 OpenIVR: Interactive Voice Response
 GNU Gatekeeper: H.323 Gatekeeper
 PSTNGw: Serves as a gateway between H.323 and PSTN
 CallGen323: H.323 call generator

Related Projects
Open Phone Abstraction Library (OPAL)

External links 
 H323Plus Project page
 H323Plus programming tutorial
 PyH323Plus Python bindings for H323Plus using Cython
 OpenMCU-ru a fork of OpenMCU

VoIP software